Kozybayevo is a rural locality (a village) in Lobanovskoye Rural Settlement, Permsky District, Perm Krai, Russia. The population was 48 as of 2010. There are 13 streets.

Geography 
Kozybayevo is located 23 km south of Perm (the district's administrative centre) by road. Bolshoy Burtym is the nearest rural locality.

References 

Rural localities in Permsky District